Thomas Anthony John Rubython (born 22 August 1955) is a British author and publisher with an interest in business and motor racing.

Biography 
Tom Rubython is a well known publisher and was the founder and publisher of Marketeer (weekly), Amusement Business (monthly), LeisureWeek (weekly), BusinessAge (monthly), Sunday Business (weekly), EuroBusiness (monthly), Formula 1 Magazine (monthly), BusinessF1 magazine (monthly), and SportsPro (monthly). He has written nine books, biographies of Ayrton Senna (racing driver), Tony O'Reilly (businessman), James Hunt (racing driver), Richard Burton (actor), Jesse Livermore (financier), and Barry White (singer) and two non-fiction motor racing books called In The Name Of Glory and Fatal Weekend. His book Shunt was the basis for Ron Howard's film Rush. He has also published many yearbooks and annuals including the Leisure Industry Yearbook, the Offshore Finance Annual, the Formula One Annual, and the Formula One Black Book.

In 2020 Rubython relaunched BusinessF1 magazine.

Libel suits 
Rubython has interviewed many famous figures over the years from Donald Trump to Tony Blair. He has enjoyed a controversial journalistic career and has reputedly been sued for libel more times than any other British journalist including lawsuits from figures such as Sir Alan Sugar, Tony Ryan, George Walker, Max Mosley, Bernie Ecclestone, Ken Bates, and Kelvin Mackenzie. Most of the lawsuits were later settled, though he lost one to Tony Purnell, he won against Richard Woods.

Politics 
In 2012 he briefly dabbled in politics and stood for the UK Independence Party in Northampton North at the 2015 General Election, receiving 6,354 votes (16%).

Personal 

Tom Rubython was a bachelor, until in 2013, at the age of 58, he married his girlfriend of two years, Beverley. He was one of the first people in the UK to clone a dog after his beloved cocker spaniel, Daisy died in 2016. Famously he hid the fact from his wife until the two new spaniels, cloned from Daisy, arrived at Heathrow from Seoul in 2017.

References

Living people
British male journalists
1955 births